Events in the year 1961 in Belgium.

Incumbents
Monarch: Baudouin
Prime Minister: Gaston Eyskens (until 25 April), Théo Lefèvre (starting 25 April)

Events
 15 February – Sabena Flight 548
 26 March – Belgian general election, 1961

Births
 14 March – Christ'l Smet, windsurfer
 23 April – Patrick De Koning, archer
 25 April – Frank De Winne, astronaut
 13 May – Marc De Mesmaeker, police officer
 22 May – Elke Tindemans, politician
 29 June – Wim Claes, composer (died 2018)
 12 July – Diederik Foubert, cyclist
 16 July – Willem Wijnant, cyclist
 28 July – Gerda Sierens, cyclist
 6 August – Rudy Patry, cyclist
 14 August – Peter Joos, Olympic fencer
 11 September – Sophie de Schaepdrijver, historian
 14 September – Karl Meersman, cartoonist
 18 September – Danny Lippens, cyclist
 10 November – Bruno Tuybens, politician
 22 November – Myriam Vanlerberghe, politician
 30 December – Bernard Clerfayt, politician

Deaths
 17 May – Frans Van Cauwelaert, politician (born 1880)
 6 June – Julius Raes, Capucin archivist (born 1884)
 4 August – Victor van Strydonck de Burkel, general (born 1876)
 17 December – John Van Alphen, footballer (born 1914)

References

 
1960s in Belgium
Belgium
Years of the 20th century in Belgium
Belgium